The International String Figure Association is not-for-profit organization for the preservation, dissemination, and creation of string figures. The association was founded in Japan in 1978 by mathematician Hiroshi Noguchi and Anglican missionary Philip Noble, and is now run by Mark Sherman out of California. Members have included Honor Maude. ISFA publishes the Bulletin of the International String Figure Association (ISSN 1076-7886) annually, ISFA News semi-annually, and String Figure Magazine quarterly (ISSN 1087-1527).

Mission and activities
The mission of the ISFA is to "gather, preserve, and distribute string figure knowledge so that future generations will continue to enjoy" them.

Activities of the association include working backwards and attempting variations to solve "Figures Known Only from the Finished Pattern". Other activities include the Arctic String Figure Project.

See also
List of string figures

Bibliography
International String Figure Association. Fascinating String Figures. . Illustrations and text by Mark A. Sherman and Joseph D'Antoni, compilation of material first published in String Figure Magazine in 1996 and 1997.

References

External links
International String Figure Association, in English
ISFA ISRAEL, ISFA in Hebrew
Association Internationale du Jeu de Ficelle, ISFA in French
国際あやとり協会, ISFA in Japanese
Internationaler Verein für Fadenfiguren, ISFA in German

International non-profit organizations
Non-profit organizations based in California
String figures
Organizations established in 1978
1978 establishments in Japan